Ondřej Valenta (born 27 January 1973) is a Czech cross-country skier. He competed in the men's 30 kilometre freestyle event at the 1994 Winter Olympics.

References

External links
 

1973 births
Living people
Czech male cross-country skiers
Olympic cross-country skiers of the Czech Republic
Cross-country skiers at the 1994 Winter Olympics
People from Ústí nad Orlicí
Sportspeople from the Pardubice Region